The 2015 Bethune–Cookman Wildcats football team represented Bethune-Cookman University in the 2015 NCAA Division I FCS football season. They were led by first-year head coach Terry Sims and played their home games at Municipal Stadium. They were a member of the Mid-Eastern Athletic Conference (MEAC). They finished the season 9–2, 7–1 in MEAC play to finish in a three-way tie for the MEAC title with North Carolina A&T and North Carolina Central. 2015 was the first year the MEAC champion abstained from the FCS Playoffs. Due to their head-to-head loss to North Carolina A&T, they were not invited to the newly formed Celebration Bowl and also did not receive an at-large bid to the FCS Playoffs.

Schedule
Source: Schedule

Ranking movements

References

Bethune-Cookman
Bethune–Cookman Wildcats football seasons
Mid-Eastern Athletic Conference football champion seasons